Placodiscus opacus is a species of plant in the family Sapindaceae. It is found in Cameroon, Central African Republic, Equatorial Guinea, and Gabon. Its natural habitat is subtropical or tropical moist lowland forests. It is threatened by habitat loss.

References

opacus
Vulnerable plants
Taxonomy articles created by Polbot